Kahkewistahaw First Nation ( kâh-kîwîstahâw)  is a Saulteaux- and Cree-speaking First Nation in southern Saskatchewan, Canada. The name Kahkewistahaw means "Eagle flying in the air". Their reserves include:
 Kahkewistahaw 72
 Kahkewistahaw 72A-1
 Kahkewistahaw 72B
 Kahkewistahaw 72C
 Kahkewistahaw 72D
 Kahkewistahaw 72E
 Kahkewistahaw 72F
 Kahkewistahaw 72G
 Kahkewistahaw 72H
 Kahkewistahaw 72I
 Kahkewistahaw 72J
 Kahkewistahaw 72K
 Kahkewistahaw 72L
 Kahkewistahaw 72M
 Kahkewistahaw 72N
 Treaty Four Reserve Grounds 77, shared with 32 other bands.

References

First Nations in Saskatchewan